Župski Razboj is a village in the municipality of Srbac, Republika Srpska, Bosnia and Herzegovina.

Villages in Republika Srpska